Six Views of the Blues is an album by American jazz organist Jimmy Smith featuring performances recorded in 1958 but not released on the Blue Note label until 1999. Originally the single "The Swingin' Shepherd Blues" was released in 1958 as Blue Note 45–1711.

Reception
The Allmusic review by Ken Dryden awarded the album 3 stars, stating:

Track listing
All compositions by Jimmy Smith except as indicated
 "St. Louis Blues" (W. C. Handy) – 8:38
 "The Swingin' Shepherd Blues" (Moe Koffman) – 3:55
 "Blues No. 1" – 6:25
 "Blues No. 3" – 7:10
 "Blues No. 4" – 10:45
 "Blues No. 2" – 9:00
Recorded at Rudy Van Gelder Studio in Hackensack, New Jersey, on July 16, 1958

Personnel

Musicians
 Jimmy Smith – organ
 Cecil Payne – baritone saxophone
 Kenny Burrell – guitar
 Donald Bailey – drums (tracks 4–6), 
 Art Blakey – drums (tracks 1–3)

Technical
 Alfred Lion – producer
 Rudy Van Gelder – engineer
 Francis Wolff – photography

References

Blue Note Records albums
Jimmy Smith (musician) albums
1999 albums
Albums produced by Alfred Lion
Albums recorded at Van Gelder Studio